Stronger Everyday is the fourth studio album by Jon B. It was released October 5, 2004 on Sanctuary Records.  After recording three albums for Epic Records, Jon felt he was being underpromoted.

He was signed to Sanctuary by Destiny's Child manager Mathew Knowles who was just hired as the president of urban music at the primarily rock oriented label.  Stronger Everyday was originally recorded under DreamWorks Records under the working title Everyday Struggles, but the label folded in early 2004 before Jon got to release any material.

The album spawned the singles "Everytime" and "Lately".

Track listing
From Discogs.

"Everytime" (featuring Dirt McGirt) (Jonathan Buck, Keil Holliwood, Jack Knight, Mechalie Jamison) (5:04)
"Lately" (Durell Babbs, Jonathan Buck, Ainsoworth Prasad, Obi Nwobosi, Kenneth Edmonds) (3:25)
"One More Dance" (Jonathan Buck, Keil Holliwood) (4:50)
"I'm Right Here" (Jack Knight, Luke Larkin, Shannon Jones) (3:24)
"Hands on U" (Mike City) (4:07)
"Patience" (Jonathan Buck, Keil Holliwood, Nathan Cruise, Jr.) (4:39)
"Part 2" (featuring Tupac Shakur) (Jonathan Buck, Johnny Jackson, Tupac Shakur) (4:02)
"Stronger Everyday (featuring Tank) (Jonathan Buck, Durell Babbs) (4:00)
"Thru the Fire" (featuring Scarface) (Jonathan Buck, Keil Holliwood, Mechalie Jamison, Brad Jordan) (5:51)
"What in the World" (Jonathan Buck) (4:10)
"Az U" (Jonathan Buck, Keil Holliwood, Eric Allen) (4:15)
"Multiple" (Tommie McLaughlin, Jonathan Buck, Joaquin Bynum, Jason Edmonds, Jerome Goodall) (5:24)
"Lay it Down" (Jonathan Buck, Jamie Stemmons) (4:21)
"Before it's Gone" (Jonathan Buck, Keil Holliwood) (5:04)
"What I Like About You" (featuring Babyface) (Jonathan Buck, Kenneth Edmonds) (4:24)
"Everytime Remix" (featuring Beenie Man & Farena) (Justin Smith, Jonathan Buck, Ainsoworth Prasad, Doron "Jr." Bell, Anthony President, Anthony Davis) (4:15)

Personnel
 Keyboards and Drum Programming: Jon B., Anthony President, Brainz Dimillo, Mike City, Michael Angelo Saulsberry, Babyface, Just Blaze
 Piano: Tank
 Drum Programming: Ale-oop, Gregg P.
 Guitar: Daryl Spencer, Tim Kobza, Babyface
 Bass: Jon B.
 Background vocals: Jon B., Tank, Babyface, Conesha Monet, Jason Edmonds, Envyi
 Recording engineer: Ryan West, Brainz Dimlllo, Jon B., Franny "Franchise" Graham, Corey Wells, Jerome Goodall, Wayne Williams
 Mixing: Serban Ghenea, Kevin "KD" Davis, Ian Boxhill, Dexter Simmons, Bob Power, Jean-Marie Horvat
 Executive producer: Jon B., Tracey E. Edmonds, Mathew Knowles, Michael McQuarn
 Co-Executive producer: Ozz Saturne
 Package Design: Andiri Inc.

Samples
 "Stronger Everyday" contains a sample of "Somebody Loves Me", as performed by Sister Sledge
 "Thru The Fire" contains a sample of "Precious Memories", as performed by Aretha Franklin

References

2004 albums
Albums produced by Just Blaze
Jon B. albums